Jayaprada is a 1939 Telugu-language historical drama film directed by Ch. Narasimha Rao. This film was also released with the title Puroorava chakravarti. This is the first movie for which S. Rajeswara Rao gave a full music score as a composer. C. S. R. Anjaneyulu played the role of Puroorava in this film.

Plot
Pururava was one of the six mightiest emperors of ancient India. When an army attacks his fort, unwilling to have a bloodshed because of a possible fight, Pururava escapes with his wife and two kids to a forest close by. From there the king and the queen are employed at a prosperous person by name Narayana Sait. The rest of the story moves around how Sani, the planet that troubles people creates perils for Pururava and his wife and how they win over them. The story ends showing Pururava in his pomp and glory, surmounting all his difficulties.

Casting

Sound track
Aiswaryamuletlu Poyinanugaanee
Athadaanyaayapu Chakravarthi
Bhagavathee Naluvasathee Kaavavae Jananee
Bheekaraaranya Seemala Veduka
Erugavugaani Kaalagati
Etula Sahinchedavo Nae Jananeejanakula
Haanaatha Haa Kaantha Yanuchu
Janapatikae Tagunaa Yee Kooleeyuni Bratuku
Maargamadaedo Ganchudee Daehanu Nithyamoo Kaadidee Vinudee
Maayaavilaasamae Kaadaa Jagathee
Manoharamee Vanaamthaseemaa Mudaavahambagugaa
Manujaaliki Nee Dharani Padhaanaa Kalpabhooruhame
Marathumaninaa Marapuraavo
Naenu Narasathee Maryaada
Nanu Bigiyaara Kougita

and 9 other songs

References

1939 films
1930s Telugu-language films
Indian drama films
1939 drama films